Robert P. Kogod is a business executive and philanthropist. Along with his brother-in-law, Robert H. Smith, Kogod led the Charles E. Smith Companies, the real estate company that developed much of the Crystal City neighborhood, just south of Washington, D.C.

Career
In 1956, Kogod, who was already a real estate developer, married Arlene Smith, the daughter of real estate tycoon Charles E. Smith. In 1959, Kogod joined the Charles E. Smith Companies.
Kogod and his brother-in-law, Robert H. Smith, took charge of the company in 1967. Robert Smith oversaw construction and development, and Kogod led leasing and management. In 1995, Forbes estimated the Smith family fortune to be worth $560 million. In 2001, the residential division of the company was merged into Archstone, which was sold to Equity Residential and Avalon Bay in 2013. The commercial division of the company was merged into Vornado Realty Trust, which merged the division into JBG Smith in 2017.

Trustee positions
Kogod is a member of the Board of Regents of the Smithsonian Institution; and the Board of Directors of the District of Columbia College Access Program, the Jewish Federation of Greater Washington, Hillel International and the Island Foundation on Mount Desert Island, Maine.

Philanthropy
Kogod has given to education, the arts, and Jewish causes. His philanthropic contributions have helped fund the following:

 In 1979, American University renamed its business school as the Kogod School of Business after a significant donation by Kogod.
 In 1980, Kogod was involved in the development of the Embassy of Israel in Washington, D.C.
 In 2004, Kogod made a $25 million gift to the Smithsonian Institution to renovate the historic Patent Office Building.
 In 2007, Kogod's gift to the Smithsonian Institution also funded a glass canopy, designed by Sir Norman Foster, over the 28,000 square foot Kogod Courtyard that joins the Smithsonian American Art Museum and the National Portrait Gallery.
 Kogod Cradle, a 200-seat flexible space for plays at Arena Stage.
 Kogod Lobby and Kogod House at Studio Theatre, opened in 2004.
 Arlene and Robert Kogod Center for the Arts, a classroom building with a 465-seat theater, opened in 1982, at Sidwell Friends School.
 Robert & Arlene Kogod Theater, a 200-seat flexible space, opened in 2001 at the Clarice Smith Performing Arts Center at the University of Maryland.
 The ARK Theatre, a 110-seat flexible space, opened in 2006 at the Signature Theatre.
 Arlene and Robert Kogod Lobby at the Shakespeare Theatre Company
 Kogod made a $2 million contribution to the Woolly Mammoth Theatre Company.
 Robert and Arlene Kogod Program on Aging at the Mayo Clinic.
 Kogod Research Center for Contemporary Jewish Thought at the Shalom Hartman Institute.
 Robert and Arlene Kogod Library of Judaic Studies
 Kogod Liquors, a fine establishment for whiskey, deli meats. "Since 1946, Kogod Liquors and Deli has provided great wine & spirits through the thick of it all."

Political involvement
Kogod has contributed to the campaigns of many politicians, almost all members of the Democratic Party, including Chris Van Hollen and Charles Schumer.

References

1930s births
21st-century American businesspeople
21st-century American philanthropists
20th-century American businesspeople
20th-century American philanthropists
American real estate businesspeople
American University alumni
Giving Pledgers
Jewish American philanthropists
Living people
Smith family (real estate)
21st-century American Jews